Cuoiovaldarno Romaiano Football Club, colloquially known as Cuoiovaldarno, was an Italian football club based in Santa Croce sull'Arno, Tuscany.

History
The club was founded in 2003 with the denomination of Cuoiopelli Cappiano Romaiano, as a merger between Cappiano Romaiano, a small team from Ponte a Cappiano, frazione of Fucecchio, who was just promoted to Serie C2 at the time, and Cuoiopelli, a regionally more renowned Serie D team from Santa Croce sull'Arno.

The club played in Lega Pro Seconda Divisione consecutively from 2003 to 2009, when they were defeated by Bellaria in the relegation playoffs. In June 2009, the club announced a switch to the denomination of Cuoiovaldarno. Only a month later the club's chairman renounced playing in Serie D for the 2009–10 season, causing the exit of the club from football panorama.

Colors and badge
The team's colors were white, red and blue.

Notable former players
 David Balleri (for Cuoiopelli, before the merger)
 Marco Landucci
 Cristiano Lucarelli (for Cuoiopelli, before the merger)
 Massimiliano Allegri (first team)

References

External links
Official club website 

Defunct football clubs in Italy
Football clubs in Tuscany
Association football clubs established in 2003
Association football clubs disestablished in 2009
Serie C clubs
2003 establishments in Italy
2009 disestablishments in Italy